Mount Vernon is the county seat of Skagit County, Washington, United States. The population was 35,219 at the 2020 census. It is one of two principal cities of and included in the Mount Vernon-Anacortes, Washington Metropolitan Statistical Area. Downtown Mount Vernon is known for its annual Tulip Festival Street Fair, which is part of the Skagit Valley Tulip Festival. The climate of Skagit County is similar to that of Northern France, with millions of tulips grown in the Skagit Valley. In 1998, Mount Vernon was rated the #1 "Best City in America" by the New Rating Guide to Life in America's Small Cities.

History

Early days

Jasper Gates and Joseph Dwelley first settled on the banks of the Skagit River, where the city of Mount Vernon now lies, in 1870. Later on, Harrison Clothier came to the community in 1877 to teach school and join in business with a former student, E.G. English. They were later recognized as the city's founders and pioneer businessmen. A post office was established in November 1877 with Clothier appointed postmaster. The city was named after Mount Vernon, the plantation estate and resting place of George Washington. The two men laid out the city's first plan while the area was still heavily timbered.

Mount Vernon's first industry was logging; camps were set up to log the townsite. The community grew quickly following the loggers, and hotels and saloons opened up along the Skagit River next to English & Clothiers' store. While poised to grow, river access to the community was stymied by a massive and ancient log jam in the river which prevented large ships from being able to port. Mail carriers instead had to paddle canoes down-stream to nearby Skagit City which enjoyed a brief period of prosperity thanks to this obstacle. The mining activity at nearby Ruby Creek spurred growth for a short time in 1880, gaining the city a new hotel, but little else was accomplished when the mines proved to be shallow. More logging operations were established but were not profitable due to the low price of logs at the time. By 1881, Mount Vernon's permanent population was a modest 75.

Growth in the 1880s was steady. In 1882, the Odd Fellows Lodge was established, followed by the first newspaper in 1884, The Skagit News. The first church, Baptist, was also established in 1884 but wouldn't build a permanent building for several years. In November 1884, Mount Vernon's future was secured when it was chosen for the new Skagit County seat, taking the designation from La Conner. The Odd fellows building, built the following year, served the county's needs until a permanent building was built.

Railroad and growth into the 20th century
Mount Vernon's growth was helped by its central location in reference to the mining, logging and farming communities of the eastern and central parts of the county as well as its access to Puget Sound. The only thing it was lacking was a railroad connection to the outside world, especially, Everett, Seattle and Vancouver, B.C. A committee was appointed in 1889 to negotiate with railroads on line placement. Their efforts paid off when the Great Northern Railway agreed to lay their line through the city. This was completed in 1891. The city was also in the process of convincing the Seattle, Lake Shore and Eastern Railway to come to Mt. Vernon. This deal fell through after the railroad was acquired by Northern Pacific Railway who chose to lay tracks further east through Sedro-Woolley in 1896.

The railroad's arrival caused great commotion in Mount Vernon, bringing hundreds of new businesses and residents. Mount Vernon was officially incorporated on July 5, 1893. That same year, a large brick courthouse was built on Main street, which still stands today. Due to the area's stable economy, Mount Vernon never boomed in the 1890s like many other speculative settlements in the region, all vying for a railroad terminus. The city experienced its first of many fires in 1891 when several blocks along the waterfront were destroyed. The same year the city's riverfront eroded taking away Front Street and the west side of Main Street. The boost from the railroad's construction quickly replaced these buildings. 1891 also saw the construction of several large civic structures such as a large brick schoolhouse on the hill above the city as well as the Mount Vernon Opera House, designed by Peacock & Dalton.

Growth slowed considerably after the Panic of 1893. Following a large flood in 1894, the first dike was built along the Skagit River. Another great fire in 1900 wiped out all of Mount Vernon's original structures including English & Clothiers' store and the Ruby Hotel. Fire would destroy more downtown businesses in 1903. The city finally received a water system in 1902 after a failed attempt in 1894.

Later events and transportation
The city again grew in the 1910s when it became the southern terminus for the Bellingham & Skagit Railway's interurban railroad line, which would carry passengers as well as freight between Bellingham and Mount Vernon as well as Burlington and Sedro-Woolley. The line opened on August 31, 1912, with passenger trips to Bellingham every two hours during the day and freight operating at night. Mount Vernon business owners soon began pressuring the railway company, since renamed the Pacific Northwest Traction Company, to extend the rails south to connect with the interurban line in Everett. Plagued by a weakening economy, the onset of America's entrance into World War I in 1917, and numerous infrastructure failures that led to line closures for months at a time, extension of the interurban was put off indefinitely. The completion of the Pacific Highway between Seattle and Bellingham in 1920 posed a great threat to the still incomplete interurban line. After a series of accidents and bridge wash outs, passenger service on the money-losing line was permanently suspended in June 1930. In 1969, Interstate 5 was built through downtown, severing it from most of the residential district and opening the farm lands north of the city to urban development, where many of Mount Vernon's downtown businesses moved.

Notable buildings

The Historic Lincoln Theatre on First Street in downtown Mount Vernon was originally built in 1926 as a vaudeville and silent movie house. Through the early 1980s, the Lincoln was a movie theater showing first-run films and now hosts live theatrical performances and concerts while also showcasing classic, as well as contemporary, movies year-round. The Lincoln is one of only 98 theaters in the United States that still possesses its original Wurlitzer theatre organ, which is often played prior to a show.

Geography

Climate
Like much of the Pacific Northwest, according to the Köppen climate classification, Mount Vernon falls within a cool dry-summer subtropical zone (Csb), with "cool"-summer Mediterranean characteristics. Other sources classify it as belonging in the marine west coast climate (Köppen Cfb) zone, with cool, wet winters and warm, distinctly drier summers.

Flood control and waterfront redevelopment

Since this city was founded, the downtown area of Mount Vernon bordering the Skagit River has been plagued by flooding, especially during times of heavy rain. In the spring of 2007, the city council authorized the mayor to purchase a mobile flood wall from Norway-based company AquaFence, the first such flood wall sold in the United States. The flood wall was completed in 2019.

After adequate flood control is in place, a Citizens' Advisory Committee plans to enhance the city's use of the revetment, which is currently used mostly for parking and a seasonal farmer's market. Current plans call for a promenade with condos or mixed-use development facing the river. A two- or three-story parking garage is planned to replace the revetment parking lost due to development. During Thanksgiving 2017 the city, as well as Lyman and Hamilton, experienced flooding; and again on November 15, 2021.

Transportation
Mount Vernon's main transportation hub is Skagit Station, built in 2004, which is served by Amtrak and bus operators. Commuters and travelers can switch between modes of transportation in downtown Mount Vernon. The station offers stops for Skagit Transit buses, Greyhound bus, Amtrak Cascades rail and local taxi. The new Everett Express bus route connects to the Sounder Train in Everett.

It has service on two cargo airlines.

Major highways
 Interstate 5 runs north–south from the Mexican Border to the Peace Arch at the Canada–US border, at Blaine, Washington and to the Surrey, British Columbia border-crossing. It connects Mount Vernon to Seattle, Portland, Eugene, Redding, Sacramento, Los Angeles and San Diego.
 State Route 9 runs parallel to Interstate 5, linking Mount Vernon with Snohomish and Arlington to the south and Sedro-Woolley and the Canada–US border near Sumas to the north.
 State Route 536 runs from SR 20 into downtown Mount Vernon and Interstate 5.
 State Route 538 runs east–west from Interstate 5 to SR 9 at the Baker Heights neighborhood of Mount Vernon.

Government and Politics
The City of Mount Vernon is a code city and uses a Mayor-Council form of government. The Mayor is the chief executive and administrative officer for the City of Mount Vernon and oversees and manages all operations including: Finance, City Attorney, Information Services, Human Resources, Development Services, Library, Public Works, Parks and Enrichment Services, Police, and Fire Department. This includes a City staff of 235 full time employees, 56 part time/seasonal employees, and a total City budget of $70 million. The directly elected mayor serves a four-year term, with the next election being set to occur on November 7, 2023. Six of the seven city council members are elected by the three wards of Mount Vernon for staggered four-year terms. The seventh council member is elected at-large every two years. Incumbent Mayor of Mount Vernon Jill Boudreau started her third term on January 1, 2020.

Mount Vernon is represented by  Representative Rick Larsen (D) in the U.S. House of Representatives representing the state's 2nd district, and represented in Olympia by the 40th, 39th, and 10th districts.

Demographics

The median income for a household in the city was $53,496. Males had a median income of $33,724 versus $27,244 for females. The per capita income for the city was $17,041. About 10.8% of families and 15.9% of the population were below the poverty line, including 18.9% of those under age 18 and 7.1% of those age 65 or over.

2010 census
As of the census of 2010, there were 31,743 people, 11,342 households, and 7,443 families residing in the city. The racial makeup of the city was 72.8% White, 1.0% African American, 1.6% Native American, 2.7% Asian, 0.2% Pacific Islander, 17.6% from other races, and 4.0% from two or more races. Hispanic or Latino of any race were 33.7% of the population.

There were 11,342 households, of which 37.1% had children under the age of 18 living with them, 47.6% were married couples living together, 12.2% had a female householder with no husband present, 5.8% had a male householder with no wife present, and 34.4% were non-families. 26.8% of all households were made up of individuals, and 12% had someone living alone who was 65 years of age or older. The average household size was 2.74 and the average family size was 3.33.

The median age in the city was 32.3 years. 28.2% of residents were under the age of 18; 10.1% were between the ages of 18 and 24; 27.5% were from 25 to 44; 21.4% were from 45 to 64; and 12.7% were 65 years of age or older. The gender makeup of the city was 49.0% male and 51.0% female.

2000 census
As of the census of 2000, there were 26,232 people, 9,276 households, and 6,205 families residing in the city. The population density was 2,360.6 people per square mile (911.6/km2). There were 9,686 housing units at an average density of 871.6 per square mile (336.6/km2). The racial makeup of the city was 75.44% White, 0.73% African American, 1.02% Native American, 2.58% Asian, 0.15% Pacific Islander, 17.13% from other races, and 2.95% from two or more races. Hispanic or Latino of any race were 25.12% of the population.

There were 9,276 households, out of which 36.5% had children under the age of 18 living with them, 51.3% were married couples living together, 11.4% had a female householder with no husband present, and 33.1% were non-families. 26.1% of all households were made up of individuals, and 10.9% had someone living alone who was 65 years of age or older. The average household size was 2.75 and the average family size was 3.32.

In the city, the age distribution of the population shows 29.0% under the age of 18, 11.9% from 18 to 24, 29.0% from 25 to 44, 17.6% from 45 to 64, and 12.5% who were 65 years of age or older. The median age was 31 years. For every 100 females, there were 96.2 males. For every 100 females age 18 and over, there were 92.9 males.

Notable people
 Glenn Beck, American television and radio host
 Cheryl Bentyne, Grammy Award–winning singer and member of The Manhattan Transfer
 Winnie Brinks, majority leader of the Michigan Senate
 Jim Caviezel, film and television actor, portrayed John Reese on CBS drama series Person of Interest from 2011 to 2016
 Scott Clements, professional poker player
 Harriet Ball Dunlap, temperance leader
 Don Eldridge, businessman and politician
 R. Garcia y Robertson, fantasy and science fiction writer
 David Gates, Singer/songwriter for the 1970s group Bread, and cattle rancher
 N. Bruce Hannay, physical chemist, Vice President of Bell Telephone Laboratories
 Mark Hendrickson, Major League Baseball player and former NBA basketball player
Oscar Jimenez, soccer player for Louisville City FC
 Craig Kelly, pioneer snowboarder
 Kyle Kendrick, Major League Baseball, Starting Pitcher for the Philadelphia Phillies
 Graham Kerr, culinary expert, author and television personality known as "The Galloping Gourmet"
 Chad Lindberg, film and television actor
 Ross Mathews, Ross the Intern on the Tonight Show, host of E!'s Hello Ross, appearances on Chelsea Lately, Judge on RuPaul's Drag Race
 T. J. Oshie, ice hockey player for the Washington Capitals (NHL) and U.S. Olympian
 Michael E. Pegram, the owner of the 1998 Kentucky Derby and Preakness Stakes winner Real Quiet
 Jillian Speer, musician and singer
 Coady Willis, drummer for Melvins, Big Business and Murder City Devils

Sister cities
Mount Vernon has the following Sister Cities, according to the Washington State Lt. Governor's office:

  Chilliwack, British Columbia, Canada

See also
 Skagit City

References

External links

 City website
 Mount Vernon's annual Tulip Festival
 Lincoln Theater

 
Cities in Washington (state)
Cities in Skagit County, Washington
County seats in Washington (state)
Populated places established in 1870
1870 establishments in Washington Territory